Todd Garner is an American film producer and is the founder and head of Broken Road Productions.

Biography 
Garner is a former Disney executive, and was formerly co-president of production at Disney. Other films produced by Garner are Anger Management (2003), 13 Going on 30 (2004), XXX (2002). Garner partnered in 2016 with Covert Media to produce two to four films a year. In 2005, Garner founded his production company -- Broken Road Productions -- and signed a first-look deal with Paramount in 2018.

Garner currently hosts The Producer's Guide: Todd Garner & Hollywood's Elite, which takes an in-depth look at the movie business and what it takes to be a producer in today's world.

Garner produced the films Paul Blart: Mall Cop  Here Comes the Boom, Zookeeper, and Paul Blart: Mall Cop 2, all of which starred Kevin James, as well as the horror films The Possession of Hannah Grace and Scouts Guide to the Zombie Apocalypse.s

Garner is set to produce Senior Year in 2022 for Netflix, along with producers Rebel Wilson, Timothy M. Bourne and Chris Bender.

Filmography 
Garner acted as producer in all films unless otherwise noted:

Film 

As an actor

Thanks

Television 

As writer

References

External links 

 

Living people
American film producers
Year of birth missing (living people)
Place of birth missing (living people)